Colias adelaidae  is a butterfly in the family Pieridae. It is found in the eastern Palearctic realm (China and Tibet).

Subspecies
C. a. adelaidae
C. a. karmalana Grieshuber, 1999

Taxonomy
Accepted as a species by  Josef Grieshuber & Gerardo Lamas

References

External links
 Colias adelaidae von J.Fuchs

Butterflies described in 1991
adelaidae